Kawahla are an Arabic tribe inhabiting Eastern Sudan. The kawhala tribe conqured south Egypt and eastern Sudan in hopes of establishing Islamic influence in the region. They speak Arabic and members of this ethnicity are Sunni Muslim. There are over 40 million members worldwide, with over 2 million in Southern Egypt (Al-Ababda) and 15 million in Morocco and Mauritania 15 million in KSA and Kuwait and about 15 million in Sudan. They were close neighbors with the Jumaiah and Nubains and beja thus their arab ancestors married from these three African ethnicities.
The Kawahla are known to be the descendants of Zubayr ibn al-Awwam who migrated from the Mecca to Sudan over 1200 years ago. and has exactly 36 segments of the tribe. It is also the biggest tribe in Sudan with over 200 tribe chiefs.

Most of the Kawahla are farmers, the main crops they grow are sorghum, wheat, cotton, beans (luba) and fruits such as La loba and Nabag. Studies of the Kawahla in Kurdufan found that they migrate away from the wet season pasture to grazing land near permanent wells to wait for the dry season. In the 19th century, Hedley Vicars encountered the Kawahla, whom asked him to settle their dispute with other tribes. Lord Edward Gleichen also wrote about the Kawahla.

See also 
 Zubayrids

References

Ethnic groups in Sudan
Arabs in Sudan